Homosexual seduction was a historical sexological theory suggesting homosexuality was being spread through intergenerational sex, and older homosexuals were changing the sexual orientation of previously heterosexual youth by seducing them.

History 
The theory originated in the early 20th century's work of German psychologists such as Albert Moll and Emil Kraepelin on adolescent sexuality, and was used in the early work attempting to explain the phenomenon of male prostitution.

Legacy 
The theory has subsequently been used in homophobic propaganda and LGBT rights opposition to delay the progress of LGBT rights, by villainizing homosexual men as "old perverts who prey on children".

See also
Environment and sexual orientation
Growing Up Straight
Homosexual recruitment
Pederasty
Seduction community
Seduction of the Innocent
Sexual orientation change efforts

References 

Adolescent sexuality
Seduction
LGBT-related conspiracy theories
Male prostitution
Moral panic
Pederasty
Pseudoscience
Psychological theories
Scientific controversies
Seduction
Sexology
Sexual misconduct allegations
Sexual identity models
Sexual orientation and science
Sexual orientation change efforts
Sexuality and age